David Anthony Bell (born 21 January 1984) is a former professional footballer. A midfielder, he played for Norwich City, Coventry City, Luton Town, Rushden & Diamonds and Notts County.

Playing career
The 2006–07 season was very much a breakthrough season for him as he went from a squad player at Luton to one of the club's key players under Mike Newell and Kevin Blackwell. In January 2007 he was given a contract extension, running through to 2010.

At the end of season awards, Bell won the Internet Player of the Season and Young Supporters' Player of the Season – an achievement few fans believed possible at the start of the season, as Bell had not even broken into the starting line-up at the season's beginning.

On 28 March 2008, he joined Leicester City on loan with a view to a permanent transfer. However, Leicester's relegation to League One meant the permanent deal did not go ahead.

Was once nutmegged by Rushden and Diamonds youth team player, Aaron Watts, during a training session.

On 23 July 2008 it was confirmed that Bell had agreed a three-year deal with Norwich City, signing for an undisclosed fee. His debut for the club was delayed by an ankle injury incurred before his signing. He finally made his first appearance in a home defeat to Derby County on 4 October 2008.

On 29 January 2009, he signed for Coventry City, for a fee believed to be on the region of £500,000.

Bell scored his first goal for Coventry on 21 March 2009 with a 45-yard strike against Doncaster at the Ricoh Arena. Bell scored in Coventry's FA Cup 3rd round tie draw at Premier League club Portsmouth on 2 January 2010.

On 19 July 2013  Bell signed for Notts County after being released from his contract with Coventry. On 24 January 2014 he was released by Notts County by mutual consent and signed for King's Lynn Town.

Coaching career
On 19 October 2016, Bell was appointed as Assistant Manager to fellow former Rushden & Diamonds academy product Gary Mills at Corby Town. Bell became Corby manager in May 2017 after Mills left the club. He was sacked in September 2017.

Statistics
Stats according to Soccerbase

A.  The "Other" column constitutes appearances and goals (including substitutes) in the FA Trophy and Football League Trophy.

References

External links

Republic of Ireland profile at Soccer Scene

1984 births
People from Wellingborough
Living people
Association football midfielders
English footballers
Republic of Ireland B international footballers
Rushden & Diamonds F.C. players
Luton Town F.C. players
Leicester City F.C. players
Norwich City F.C. players
Coventry City F.C. players
Notts County F.C. players
King's Lynn Town F.C. players
National League (English football) players
English Football League players
Corby Town F.C. players
English football managers
Corby Town F.C. managers